The women's 200m ind. medley SM9 event at the 2012 Summer Paralympics took place at the  London Aquatics Centre on 6 September. There were two heats; the swimmers with the eight fastest times advanced to the final.

Results

Heats
Competed from 09:40.

Heat 1

Heat 2

Final
Competed at 17:38.

 
'Q = qualified for final.

References
Official London 2012 Paralympics Results: Heats 
Official London 2012 Paralympics Results: Final 

Swimming at the 2012 Summer Paralympics
2012 in women's swimming